Franciszek Sobczak (4 October 1939 – 24 April 2009) was a Polish fencer. He competed in the team sabre event at the 1968 Summer Olympics.

References

1939 births
2009 deaths
Polish male fencers
Olympic fencers of Poland
Fencers at the 1968 Summer Olympics
Sportspeople from Katowice